Patriarch George of Constantinople may refer to:

 George I of Constantinople, Ecumenical Patriarch in 679–686
 George II of Constantinople, Ecumenical Patriarch in 1191–1198